The 2009–10 season of the División de Honor B de Balonmano is the 16th season of second-tier handball in Spain.

Final standings

Playoffs for promotion

Semifinals

Final

External links
Scores and Standings

División de Plata de Balonmano seasons
2009–10 in Spanish handball